Ulaka is a small village north of Velike Bloke in the Municipality of Bloke in the Inner Carniola region of Slovenia.

Church

The local church, built north of the settlement, is dedicated to Saint Nicholas and belongs to the Parish of Sveta Trojica.

References

External links

Ulaka on Geopedia

Populated places in the Municipality of Bloke